General SM Shafiuddin Ahmed (born 1 December 1963) is the four star general of the Bangladesh Army and the current Chief of Army Staff (CAS) of the Bangladesh Army since June 2021. Prior to his appointment as CAS, he served as the Quartermaster general (QMG) of the Bangladesh Army as a Lieutenant General. In his 40 year long military career he also served as, Director General of Bangladesh Institute of International and Strategic Studies (BIISS), Director of Military Training (DMT), the Commander of an Infantry Brigade and an Infantry Division.

Early life and academics 
Shafiuddin Ahmed was born on 1 December 1963 in a reputed Muslim and freedom fighter's family in Khulna. His father, late Sheikh Mohammad Rokon Uddin Ahmed was a freedom fighter, professor and social worker.

Shafiuddin Ahmed is a former student of Jhenidah Cadet College of the 12th intake. Shafiuddin Ahmed has attended several military courses both at home and abroad. He is a graduate of Defence Services Command and Staff College (DSCSC), Mirpur, Bangladesh. He attended International Symposium Course in PLA National Defence University and Defence and Strategic Studies Course at the same University. He is also a NESA graduate from National Defense University, Washington DC. He attained three Master's degrees on varied disciplines. He was awarded MPhil degree with First Class on Development of Security Studies from Bangladesh University of Professionals (BUP). He obtained Masters in Defence Studies (MDS) from National University, Bangladesh. He has also obtained Master of Business Administration (MBA) from University of Dhaka where he secured 1st position and received MIST Gold Medal. He completed his PhD degree on Development of Security Studies from Bangladesh University of Professionals (BUP) in 28 August 2021.

Career 
Shafiuddin Ahmed was commissioned in the 4th Battalion the East Bengal Regiment of Bangladesh Army on 23 December 1983 in the 9th Bangladesh Military Academy Long Course. After the commission, he started his military career by joining the East Bengal Regiment in the counter insurgency operation area in the Chittagong Hill Tracts.  He served as Battalion Commander in 1st Bangladesh Battalion of Bangladesh Military Academy (BMA) and commanded an Infantry Brigade. He also served as the Director of Military Training in Military Training Directorate at the General Staff Branch, Army headquarters. He served as the General Officer Commanding & Area Commander of the 19th Infantry Division & Ghatail Area in 2012. He also served as the Director General of Bangladesh Institute of International and Strategic Studies (BIISS). Also served as the Chief of Doctrine of the Army Training & Doctrine Command (ARTDOC).

He served as a Senior Directing Staff (SDS) at National Defense College, GOC of 19th Infantry Division and the GOC of the Area Commander of Logistics Area. On 25 August 2019, he was promoted to Lieutenant General and made the General Officer Commanding (GOC) of ARTDOC. He was appointed as the 6th Colonel Commandant of Corps of Military Police on 19 October 2020. In December 2020, he was reassigned to Army headquarters to take up the position of Quartermaster General of the Bangladesh Army, with SM Matiur Rahman promoted to Lieutenant General to succeed him as ARTDOC GOC.

United Nations peacekeeping missions 
Shafiuddin Ahmed served as a Deputy Force Commander of MINUSCA in Central African Republic from 2014 to 2016 and received citations by SRSG for outstanding performance. Under UNSC in Mozambique, he served in ONUMOZ from 1993 to 1994.

As the Chief of Army Staff 
On June 10, 2021, Shafiuddin Ahmed was appointed to a three-year term to succeed General Aziz Ahmed as the 17th Bangladeshi Army Chief of Staff.  He was promoted to the rank of General on June 24, 2021, his first day in his new role.  Chief of Naval Staff Admiral M Shaheen Iqbal and Chief of Air Staff Air Chief Marshal Shaikh Abdul Hannan presented his new rank insignia in a ceremony attended by Prime Minister Sheikh Hasina at Ganabhaban.

Shafiuddin Ahmed's other current roles include chairing the Board of Directors of Bangladesh Machine Tools Factory, Bangladesh Diesel Plant Limited, Trust Bank Limited, Army Welfare Trust, and the Boards of Trustees of Sena Kalyan Sangstha and the Bangladesh Army University of Engineering & Technology. He is the President of Bangladesh Olympic Association and Bangladesh Golf Federation. He is also acting as the President of the Executive Committee of Kurmitola Golf Club. He is the Vice Chairman of the Governing Body of National Defence College and Defence Services Command & Staff College, Council of the Military Institute of Science and Technology.

Personal life 
Shafiuddin Ahmed is married to Noorjahan Ahmed, the General is a father of two daughters .

References 

1963 births
Living people
People from Khulna
People from Khulna District
Bangladesh Army generals
Chiefs of Army Staff, Bangladesh
National Defence College (Bangladesh) alumni